Congregation Beth Israel of Houston, the oldest Jewish congregation in Texas, was founded in Houston in 1854. It operates the Shlenker School.

History

The congregation was founded in 1854 as an Orthodox Jewish kehilla and legally chartered in 1859. The Orthodox Beth Israel Congregation in Houston opened in a former house that had been converted to a synagogue. In 1874 the congregation voted to change their affiliation to Reform Judaism, sparking the foundation of Congregation Adath Yeshurun, now known as Congregation Beth Yeshurun. Hyman Judah Schachtel was a past rabbi.

Beth Israel's Franklin Avenue Temple building was completed in 1874. The temple was at Crawford Street at Franklin Avenue in what is now Downtown Houston. In 1908 the congregation moved into a new temple at Crawford at Lamar Street, in an area that was a Jewish community. After the congregation left the Lamar site, the New Day Temple occupied it.  The Grove at Discovery Green occupies the former Lamar site.

Maximilian Heller was rabbi of the congregation from 1886 to 1887.

A new temple at Austin Street and Holman Avenue was dedicated in 1925. Originally it was considered to be a part of the Third Ward.

Rabbi Henry Barnston served as the Congregation's rabbi from 1900 to 1943, after which he served as rabbi emeritus until his death in 1949.

The Moderne style, 1924-built Austin Street building, designed by congregant Joseph Finger, was listed on the U.S. National Register of Historic Places in 1984 and was awarded Recorded Texas Historical Landmark status in 2009.

In 1943 Temple Beth Israel announced that people who espoused Zionist ideals, observed the laws of kashrut or favored the perpetuation of Hebrew as a language were not allowed to be members, so Emanu-El was formed by people who disagreed with the decision. As of 1967 Beth Israel  accepts people with Zionist beliefs.

In 1966 the Houston Independent School District purchased the 1920s temple building on Austin Street. HISD began using that building—at first—as an annex for San Jacinto High School since the school's population was increasing.

In the years leading to 1967, the Jewish community was moving to Meyerland. To follow the community, in 1967 the congregation moved to a new temple on North Braeswood Boulevard. The former temple building on Austin Street became the first home of Houston's High School for the Performing and Visual Arts and was renamed the Ruth Denney Theatre.  When the high school moved to new quarters, the building became a performance venue for Houston Community College's Central Fine Arts division and was renamed the Heinen Theatre. The historic building is located in Midtown Houston.

Rabbi David Lyon currently presides over the congregation of Beth Israel.

Properties

Current property
The current synagogue at 5600 North Braeswood Boulevard has a lobby with twelve needlepoints. The design of these needlepoints had inspiration in the Hadassah Medical Center's Chagall windows. The current synagogue facility has been expanded since its initial construction in order to house a Jewish school.

The Shlenker School is on the synagogue property. The school is accredited by the Independent Schools Association of the Southwest.

During the COVID-19 pandemic in Texas, as of 2022, more students attended The Shlenker School than previously. An organization called Prizmah stated in a 2021 report that families with a preference for education in a school setting during a pandemic, as opposed to via the internet, often preferred schools that continued offering such.

Cemetery
The cemetery owned by Congregation Beth Israel is the oldest Jewish cemetery in Houston.

Notable members
Josh Wolf (born 2000), baseball player in the Cleveland Indians organization and for Team Israel

See also

 History of the Jews in Houston

References
 Bell, Roselyn. "Houston." In: Tigay, Alan M. (editor) The Jewish Traveler: Hadassah Magazine's Guide to the World's Jewish Communities and Sights. Rowman & Littlefield, January 1, 1994. p. 215-220. , 9781568210780.
 Content also in: Tigay, Alan M. Jewish Travel-Prem. Broadway Books, January 18, 1987. , 9780385241984.
 Gore, Elaine Clift. Talent Knows No Color: The History of an Arts Magnet High School (Research in curriculum and instruction) Information Age Publishing, 2007. , 9781593117610.

Notes

External links

 Synagogue website
 Shlenker School
 Congregational history

Conservative synagogues in Texas
Jews and Judaism in Houston
Religious buildings and structures in Houston
Reform synagogues in Texas
National Register of Historic Places in Houston
Recorded Texas Historic Landmarks
Synagogues on the National Register of Historic Places in Texas
Independent Schools Association of the Southwest
Religious organizations established in 1854
1854 establishments in Texas
Synagogues completed in 1925
1925 establishments in Texas
Neoclassical synagogues
Synagogues completed in 1967
1967 establishments in Texas
Modernist architecture in Texas
Midtown, Houston